Dušan Nenković (Serbian Cyrillic: Душан Ненковић; 3 November 1929 – 24 August 2007) was a Serbian footballer and football manager.

Playing career
Nenković played for Radnički Kragujevac, Zemun and Timočanin.

Managerial career
Nenković managed Radnički Kragujevac, Radnički Niš, Hajduk Split, Budućnost Titograd, Independiente Santa Fe, Egypt, Brest, and Zamalek.

He won the Yugoslav Cup with Hajduk in the 1966–67 season.

Personal life
Nenković's nephew, Milutin Sredojević, is also a professional football manager who, at one point, managed Zamalek as well.

Honours

Manager
Hajduk Split 
Yugoslav Cup: 1966–67

References

External links

1929 births
2007 deaths
Sportspeople from Kragujevac
Yugoslav footballers
Serbian footballers
FK Radnički 1923 players
FK Zemun players
FK Timočanin players
Association footballers not categorized by position
Yugoslav football managers
Serbian football managers
Expatriate football managers in Egypt
Expatriate football managers in France
Yugoslav First League managers
FK Radnički 1923 managers
FK Radnički Niš managers
HNK Hajduk Split managers
FK Budućnost Podgorica managers
Independiente Santa Fe managers
Egypt national football team managers
Stade Brestois 29 managers
Zamalek SC managers